Scopula tenuispersata is a moth of the family Geometridae. It is found on Sumatra and possibly Borneo.

References

Moths described in 1902
tenuispersata
Moths of Asia